Here is a list of things named in scientist Michael Faraday's honour:

Science 
 Faraday (unit), faraday, an obsolete unit of charge that has been superseded by the coulomb
 farad, SI unit of capacitance
 Faraday balance
 Faraday cage
 Faraday constant, the amount of electric charge per mole of electrons
 Faraday cup
Faraday cup electrometer
 Faraday dark space
 Faraday disc
 Faraday effect
Faraday filter
Inverse Faraday effect
 Faraday efficiency
Faraday-efficiency effect
 Faraday flashlight
 Faraday's ice pail experiment
 Faraday's laws of electrolysis
 Faraday's law of induction
Maxwell–Faraday equation
 Faraday paradox
 Faraday paradox (electrochemistry)
 Faraday rotation, see Faraday effect
Faraday rotator
Faraday tensor
Faraday wave
Faraday wheel

Places 
 Faraday building, the first telephone exchange to open in London, later the first International Switching Centre
Faraday Building (Manchester)
 The Faraday lecture theatre inside the building of the same name at Lancaster University in Lancashire, England
 Faraday Research Station, a former British research station in Antarctica, now called Vernadsky Research Base and operated by Ukraine
 Faraday (ward), an electoral ward in the London Borough of Southwark
 Faraday Dam, a dam on the Clackamas River in the U.S. state of Oregon
 Faraday House, one of the buildings at the HQ of the telecommunications company Vodafone in Newbury, Berkshire, was named after Michael Faraday and his contribution to science and technology.
 Mount Faraday in New Zealand's Paparoa Range was named after him.

Others 
 , a Siemens AG cable ship launched in 1874
 , a Siemens AG cable ship launched in 1923
 Faraday (crater), a lunar crater
 37582 Faraday, a main-belt asteroid
 Faraday Future, electric car company
 Faradaya, a genus of flowering plants
 Faradaya splendida, (now Oxara splendida) a species of vine

See also 
 
 Faraday (disambiguation)
 Faraday Prize (disambiguation)

References

Faraday
Named after